Podosphaera tridactyla var. tridactyla is a plant pathogen infecting almond.

References

Fungal tree pathogens and diseases
Fruit tree diseases
tridactyla var. tridactyla